Wang Daobang (November 23, 1911 – November 12, 1959) was a People's Liberation Army lieutenant general. He was born in Yongxin County, Jiangxi. He was commander of the People's Liberation Army's Hebei Military District (1957–1959).

1911 births
1959 deaths
People's Liberation Army generals from Jiangxi
Commanders of the Hebei Military District
People from Yongxin County